Keratoisis is a genus of deep-sea bamboo coral in the family Isididae, containing the following species:

Keratoisis chuni (Kükenthal, 1915)
Keratoisis flabellum (Nutting, 1908)
Keratoisis flexibilis (Pourtales, 1868)
Keratoisis glaesa (Grant, 1976)
Keratoisis gracilis (Thomson & Henderson, 1906)
Keratoisis grandiflora Studer, 1878
Keratoisis grandis (Nutting, 1908)
Keratoisis grayi (Wright, 1869)
Keratoisis hikurangiensis (Grant, 1976)
Keratoisis japonica Studer, 1878
Keratoisis macrospiculata (Kükenthal, 1915)
Keratoisis magnifica Dueñas, Alderslade & Sánchez, 2014
Keratoisis microspiculata Molander, 1929
Keratoisis palmae (Wright & Studer, 1889)
Keratoisis paucispinosa (Wright & Studer, 1889)
Keratoisis peara Dueñas, Alderslade & Sánchez, 2014
Keratoisis philippinensis (Wright & Studer, 1889)
Keratoisis projecta (Grant, 1976)
Keratoisis siemensii Studer, 1878
Keratoisis squarrosa (Kükenthal, 1915)
Keratoisis tangentis (Grant, 1976)
Keratoisis wrighti (Nutting, 1910)
Keratoisis zelandica (Grant, 1976)

References

Isididae
Bioluminescent cnidarians
Octocorallia genera